Adam Herz (born September 10, 1972) is an American screenwriter and producer. He founded the production company Terra Firma Films in 2003 with a first-look deal at Universal Studios.

Herz was born in New York City and raised in East Grand Rapids. He is the older of two boys, and his father, David, is a brain surgeon in Grand Rapids, Michigan. It was with his mother's (Myrna) Super 8 camera that he made his first movies while a teen. Herz graduated from East Grand Rapids High School (see also East Grand Rapids Public Schools). He moved to Los Angeles after graduation from the University of Michigan in 1996. He held a number of production assistant jobs while working on writing spec scripts.

His first screenplay, originally titled East Great Falls High, was written over a winter ski vacation in 1998. It was based on his high school years in East Grand Rapids, Michigan. It sold for a reported $650,000 in 1999 and became the film American Pie.

Herz created and runs the Emerging Writers Program, a series of classes that help upcoming screenwriters break into the business.

He is Jewish.

Herz is an avid bourbon enthusiast and runs the "Herz's Serious Whiskey Info" fan page on Facebook, which focuses on exposing sellers of counterfeit whiskey.

Filmography
 American Pie (1999) – Writer, Co-Producer
 Go Fish (2001) – Writer, Executive Producer
 American Pie 2 (2001) – Writer, Executive Producer, Actor (as Younger Business Suit)
 American Wedding (2003) – Writer, Producer
 My Best Friend's Girl (2008) – Producer
 American Reunion (2012) – Producer, Characters
 Wonder Park (2019) – Producer
 American Pie Presents: Girls' Rules (2020) – Executive Producer, characters

References

External links

Terra Firma Films - Adam Herz's production company

1972 births
Living people
American male screenwriters
Writers from Grand Rapids, Michigan
People from New York City
University of Michigan alumni
People from East Grand Rapids, Michigan
Jewish American screenwriters
Screenwriters from New York (state)
Screenwriters from Michigan
21st-century American Jews